Creative Galaxy is a children's animated science-fiction web television series that premiered on Amazon Video on April 19, 2013 and ended on June 4, 2019.

Production
In February 2015, it was renewed for a second season and premiered on September 12, 2016. The series has a holiday special called Creative Galaxy: Arty’s Holiday Masterpiece which was released on November 19, 2018. The third season was released on June 3, 2019.

Characters
 Arty (voiced by Christian Distefano (season 1); Ethan Pugiotto (season 2-3) is a leader-like boy alien who explores the Creative Galaxy in his Creative Spark rocket ship. There, he collects ideas and makes a final project out of art to help out.
 Arty’s Mom (voiced by Samantha Bee (seasons 1); Helen King (season 2-3) is Arty’s fun-loving mother.
 Arty’s Dad (voiced by Jason Jones (seasons 1); John Palmier (season 2-3) is Arty’s fun-loving father.
 Epiphany (voiced by Kira Gelineau is Arty’s sidekick. She can transform into different things magically.
 Annie (voiced by Amariah Faulkner (seasons 1-2); Lilly Bartlam (season 3)) is a girl alien with a friendly, excitable and happy personality. She is a very good friend of Arty’s.
 Juju (voiced by Kallan Holley) is a friendly girl alien who likes taking pictures with her camera. She is another good friend of Arty’s.
 Jackson (voiced by Devan Cohen) is a boy alien with a very fun-loving personality. He is friends with Arty as well.
 Pablo (voiced by Brad Adamson) is the painting teacher on Painting Planet.
 Builder Ben & Builder Betty (voiced by Cory Doran & Jennifer Walls) are two builders on Building Planet.
 Fabiana (voiced by Tricia Brioux)
 Seraphina (voiced by Brooke Shields)
 Captain Paper (voiced by Scott McCord)
 Sketch (voiced by Jason Priestley)
 Melody (voiced by Lisa Loeb)
 Galleria (voiced by Cloris Leachman) is the curator of Museum Planet.

Planets
 Museo, the Museum Planet - its curator is Galleria.
 Buildora, the Building Planet - its helpful builders are Builder Ben & Builder Betty.
 Fabrictopia, the Fabric Planet - its teacher is Fabiana.
 Paintoria, the Painting Planet - its teacher is Pablo.
 Paperia, the Paper Planet - its hero is Captain Paper.
 Drawopolis, the Drawing Planet - its creator is Sketch.
 Sculpturon, the Sculpture Planet - its teacher is Seraphina.
 Groovopolis, the Music and Dance - its teacher is Melody.
 Cooktopia, the Cooking Planet - its chef is Chef Zesty.

Episodes

Season 1 (2013–2014)

Season 2 (2016–2017)

Season 3 (2018–2019)

References

External links
 Pilot
 

2010s American animated television series
2010s American children's television series
2010s American science fiction television series
2013 American television series debuts
2019 American television series endings
2010s Canadian animated television series
2010s Canadian children's television series
2010s Canadian science fiction television series
2013 Canadian television series debuts
2019 Canadian television series endings
Amazon Prime Video children's programming
Animated television series by Amazon Studios
Amazon Prime Video original programming
American children's animated science fantasy television series
American children's animated space adventure television series
Canadian children's animated science fantasy television series
Canadian children's animated space adventure television series
American preschool education television series
Animated television series about extraterrestrial life
Canadian preschool education television series
English-language television shows
Animated preschool education television series
2010s preschool education television series
Television series created by Angela Santomero
Television series set on fictional planets
Television series by 9 Story Media Group
Television series by Amazon Studios